WGCW-LD (channel 36) is a low-power television station in Albany, Georgia, United States, affiliated with The CW Plus. It is owned by Gray Television alongside dual NBC/ABC affiliate WALB (channel 10). Both stations share studios on Stuart Avenue in Albany, where WGCW-LD's transmitter is also located.

Due to WGCW-LD's low power status, its broadcast range only covers the immediate Albany area. Therefore, it can also be seen through a 16:9 widescreen standard definition simulcast on WALB's fourth digital subchannel in order to reach the entire market; this signal can be seen on channel 10.4 from a transmitter east of Doerun, along the Colquitt–Worth county line.

History
WGCW-LD was founded on February 22, 2011, as a new low-power television station on UHF channel 36, W36EG-D. In 2019, the station became the market's CW affiliate, after owner Gray Television moved the network affiliation from the third digital subchannel of CBS affiliate WSWG (channel 44), licensed to Valdosta, which was sold by Gray to Marquee Broadcasting in order to purchase WALB from Raycom Media.

Subchannels
The station's digital signal is multiplexed:

References

Low-power television stations in the United States
GCW-LD
The CW affiliates
Television channels and stations established in 2019
2019 establishments in Georgia (U.S. state)
Gray Television